GOH or Goh may refer to:

 Gôh, a region of Ivory Coast
 Goh (Chinese surname)
 Goh (Korean surname)
 Gō (given name), a masculine Japanese given name
 General Overhaul Program of New York City Subway cars
 Glory of Heracles (series), a video game series
 Goh Hinogami, a character from the Virtual Fighter video game series
 Grand Oriental Hotel in Colombo, Sri Lanka
 Guest of honour (disambiguation)
 Nuuk Airport in Greenland
 Old High German
 Team Goh, a Japanese auto racing team
 The God of High School, a Korean web manhwa
 Goh, a character in the video game Shinobido: Way of the Ninja
 Goh, a protagonist in the Pokémon anime
 G.O.H. (1916–1932), Grand Opera House, Sydney, Australia